Theodoxus numidicus is a species of small freshwater snail with an operculum, an aquatic gastropod mollusk in the family Neritidae, the nerites.

Distribution
This species is found in Algeria and Morocco. The type locality is Oran, north-western Algeria.

Description 
The length of the shell is 7 mm.

References

 Brown D.S. (1994). Freshwater snails of Africa and their medical importance, 2nd edition. London: Taylor and Francis, 607 p

External links
 Récluz, C. A. (1841). Description de quelques nouvelles espèces de Nérites vivantes. Revue Zoologique, par la Société Cuvierienne. 1841

Neritidae
Gastropods described in 1841
Taxonomy articles created by Polbot